The Nils V. "Swede" Nelson Award is an American college football award given annually by the Gridiron Club of Greater Boston to "the player who by his conduct on and off the gridiron demonstrates a high esteem for the football code and exemplifies sportsmanship to an outstanding degree" among northeastern colleges and universities.  In 1982, the award was narrowed to the player deemed to be the "very best, and most academically talented, college football player in New England."  

Since 1989, the award has been given annually to two players (with the exception of a single winner in 1996, three winners in 2007 and 2015, and no award given during the 2020 season due to the COVID-19 pandemic), one from a Division I football program, and one from a small college.

The award is the fourth oldest collegiate football award in the United States, following the Heisman, Maxwell, and George "Bulger" Lowe trophies.

The award is named after the founder of the Gridiron Club, Nils V. "Swede" Nelson, a former college player at Harvard and coach.  Nelson was a member of the unbeaten Harvard football team that defeated Oregon in the 1920 Rose Bowl.

The inaugural winner of the trophy was quarterback Perry Moss of Illinois in 1946.  Other notable winners of the award include Doak Walker (1949), Johnny Bright (1951), Floyd Little (1966), Dick Jauron (1971), Otis Armstrong (1972), Tom Waddle (1988), Jay Fiedler (1992), Matt Hasselbeck (1997), Mark Herzlich (2009), Anthony Castonzo (2010), and Zach Allen (2018).

Past winners

References

External links
 Gridiron Club of Greater Boston - Nils V. "Swede" Nelson Award Winners

College football regional and state awards
Awards established in 1946
1946 establishments in Massachusetts